Kate Wang is a Chinese billionaire businesswoman. She is the founder of a Chinese vaping company RLX Technology.

Early life and career 
She received a Bachelor of Science degree from the Xi'an Jiaotong University and Master of Business Administration from Columbia Business School. 

Kate worked for Procter & Gamble's office in Guangzhou after graduating from college, before co-founding her own investment firm in Hong Kong. She also worked at Bain & Company between 2013 and 2014. She was the head of Uber China from 2013 to 2016, before moving to DiDi. She formed Relx Technology in 2018.

As of April 2021, her net worth was estimated at USD 5 billion by Forbes.

References

Chinese billionaires
Xi'an Jiaotong University alumni
Columbia Business School alumni
Living people
Year of birth missing (living people)
Female billionaires
Uber people
Bain & Company employees
Procter & Gamble people